V line may refer to:
 V/Line, a not for profit regional passenger train and coach operator in Victoria, Australia.
 V (New York City Subway service), a discontinued New York City subway service
 V (Los Angeles Railway), a former streetcar line in Los Angeles, California